"Song for Whoever" is a song by English music group the Beautiful South, written by band members Paul Heaton and David Rotheray. The first and highest-charting single from their debut album, Welcome to the Beautiful South, it peaked at number two on the UK Singles Chart in July 1989 and was certified Silver by the British Phonographic Industry (BPI). Considered typical of the band's gently subversive, self-reflexive signature style, it is sung from the point of view of a cynical songwriter who romances women solely to get material for love songs.

Music video
The music video for the song features a blancmange as the main character. Heaton said, "The blancmange is probably the best thing that's happened to the band so far. The idea is that there's this conveyor belt and all these pop stars come down it and get rejected by the record company people that then choose a blancmange. The blancmange goes on to be a big star but it all pretty much ends up in blancmange misery."

Track listings

Charts

Weekly charts

Year-end charts

Certifications

References

1989 debut singles
1989 songs
The Beautiful South songs
Go! Discs singles
List songs
Pop ballads
Satirical songs
Song recordings produced by Mike Hedges
Songs written by David Rotheray
Songs written by Paul Heaton